Disney's Hollywood Hotel is one of three hotels at Hong Kong Disneyland Resort in Penny's Bay, Lantau Island, Hong Kong. It officially opened with the resort on Monday, 12 September 2005. It is themed to 1930s Hollywood. The hotel has over 600 guestrooms.

It is in Islands District.

Theme
The Garden of the hotel is decorated with a Hollywood theme. Decorations include classic cars from the 1930s, a pavement decorated as a strip of film, names of roads and highways in California, the El Captain sign and even the 'world famous' "HOLLYWOOD HOTEL" sign. The hotel itself has a very art deco style, and is themed to the 1930 golden age of movies. The Hotel is vaguely U shaped. Hidden Mickeys are hidden around the site.

Facilities
There are five restaurants in the hotel. Chef Mickey (the main restaurant) has an international cuisine buffet, while Hollywood & Dine has quick-service food and beverages. Studio Lounge is a full-service bar with specialty drinks and snacks. The Sunset Terrace opens seasonally, with outdoor BBQ cuisine. The Piano Pool Bar sells drinks to guests sitting around a piano-shaped pool. The Piano Pool also has a side toddler pool, with a slide. 

The hotel also features a complementary children's arcade called Malibu Games, featuring air hockey and hoopshooting, among other things. 

Celebrity Gift sells plush, toys, pins and stationaries.

Notable guests
Aaron Kwok (郭富城)
Kelly Chen (陳慧琳)
Linda Chung (鍾嘉欣)
Louis Cheung (張繼聰)
Kay Tse (謝安琪)
Gillian Chung (鍾欣桐)
Joey Yung (容祖兒)

See also
 Disney's Hotel New York, Disneyland Resort Paris, Paris
 Disney's Ambassador Hotel, Tokyo Disney Resort, Chiba

References

External links

 Disney's Hollywood Hotel Official site

Hotels in Hong Kong Disneyland Resort
Hotels established in 2005
Hotel buildings completed in 2005
2005 establishments in Hong Kong